The 1954 Florida gubernatorial special election was held on November 2, 1954. Democratic nominee LeRoy Collins defeated Republican nominee J. Thomas Watson with 80.43% of the vote.

Background

On September 28, 1953, Governor Daniel T. McCarty, who was elected in the 1952 gubernatorial election, died in office of pneumonia. McCarty's death elevated Florida Senate President Charley E. Johns to acting governor and a special election for November 1954 was called to fill the position for the final two years of McCarty's term. The state constitution was revised in 1968 to establish a position of Lieutenant Governor who is first in line to succeed the governor.

Primary elections
Primary elections were held on May 4, 1954, with the Democratic runoff held on May 25, 1954.

Democratic primary

Candidates
LeRoy Collins, State Senator
Charley E. Johns, incumbent acting Governor
J. Brailey Odham, former State Representative

Results

Republican primary

Candidates
J. Thomas Watson, former Florida Attorney General
Charles E. Compton

Results

General election

Candidates
LeRoy Collins, Democratic
J. Thomas Watson, Republican

Campaign

Watson, the Republican nominee, died on 24 October. His name remained on the ballot.

Results

References

Bibliography
 
 
 

1954
Florida
Gubernatorial
Gubernatorial 1954
Florida 1954
November 1954 events in the United States